The 1952 Princeton Tigers football team was an American football team that represented Princeton University during the 1952 college football season. In their eighth year under head coach Charlie Caldwell, the Tigers compiled an 8–1 record and outscored opponents 297 to 74. Frank M. McPhee was the team captain.

The Tigers were ranked No. 12 in the preseason AP poll and stayed in the top 20 until suffering their only loss of the year, in mid-October. They then re-entered the rankings in mid-November and finished the year as the only ranked Ivy Group team.

Princeton played its home games at Palmer Stadium on the university campus in Princeton, New Jersey.

Schedule

References

Princeton
Princeton Tigers football seasons
Princeton Tigers football